{{DISPLAYTITLE:C12H10O2}}
The molecular formula C12H10O2 (molar mass: 186.20 g/mol, exact mass: 186.0681 u) may refer to:

 1-Naphthaleneacetic acid (NAA)
 2,2'-Biphenol
 4,4'-Biphenol